A Mi Shabba is an album by Shabba Ranks. It was released after a two-year gap in album releases and received fairly average reviews.

Track listing

References

1995 albums
Shabba Ranks albums
Epic Records albums